Arnaud Jacquemet (born March 29, 1988) is a Swiss professional ice hockey defenseman who currently plays for and is an alternate captain of Genève-Servette HC of the National League (NL).

Jacquemet is one of the few players in the NL who can play both as a forward and as a defenseman.

Jacquemet made his National League A debut playing with Kloten Flyers during the 2008–09 NLA season.

References

External links

1988 births
Living people
EHC Biel players
Genève-Servette HC players
EHC Kloten players
Kootenay Ice players
SCL Tigers players
Swiss ice hockey forwards
People from Sion, Switzerland
Sportspeople from Valais